João Mário Neto Lopes (born 3 January 2000), known as João Mário, is a Portuguese professional footballer who plays for FC Porto as a right winger or a right-back.

Club career
Born in São João da Madeira, João Mário began at hometown club A.D. Sanjoanense before joining the ranks of FC Porto at the age of nine. On 7 October 2018, while still a junior, he made his professional debut with the reserve team in a LigaPro match against F.C. Arouca, coming on for Tiago Matos for the last 11 minutes of a 1–0 home loss. The following 5 January, he scored his first goal in a 2–2 draw with S.L. Benfica B also at the Estádio Dr. Jorge Sampaio.

On 10 June 2020, João Mário had his first call-up to Porto's first team, remaining unused as they won 1–0 at home to C.S. Marítimo. He debuted on 15 July as they won the Primeira Liga title with a 2–0 win over Sporting CP also at the Estádio do Dragão, playing the last five minutes in place of Luis Díaz. On 1 August he was on the bench in the 2–1 defeat of S.L. Benfica in the final of the Taça de Portugal, securing a double.

João Mário was eventually reconverted by manager Sérgio Conceição into a right-back.

International career
João Mário won his first cap for Portugal at under-21 level on 4 September 2020, and scored in the 4–0 away victory against Cyprus for the 2021 UEFA European Championship qualifiers.

Career statistics

Honours
Porto Youth
UEFA Youth League: 2018–19

Porto
Primeira Liga: 2019–20, 2021–22
Taça de Portugal: 2019–20, 2021–22
Taça da Liga: 2022–23
Supertaça Cândido de Oliveira: 2022

References

External links

2000 births
Living people
People from São João da Madeira
Sportspeople from Aveiro District
Portuguese footballers
Association football defenders
Association football wingers
Primeira Liga players
Liga Portugal 2 players
Padroense F.C. players
FC Porto B players
FC Porto players
Portugal youth international footballers
Portugal under-21 international footballers